Samuel Hardwicke Mays Jr. (born 1948) is a senior United States district judge of the United States District Court for the Western District of Tennessee.

Education and career

Born in Memphis, Tennessee, Mays received a Bachelor of Arts degree from Amherst College in 1970 and a Juris Doctor from Yale Law School in 1973. He was in private practice in Tennessee from 1973 to 1995, and was then legal counsel to the Governor of Tennessee, Don Sundquist, from 1995 to 1997. He was a deputy and chief of staff to the Governor from 1997 to 2000, returning to private practice in Tennessee from 2000 to 2002.

District court service

On January 23, 2002, Mays was nominated by President George W. Bush to a seat on the United States District Court for the Western District of Tennessee vacated by Jerome Turner. Mays was confirmed by the United States Senate on May 9, 2002, and received his commission on May 10, 2002. He assumed senior status on July 1, 2015.

Sources

1948 births
Living people
Amherst College alumni
Judges of the United States District Court for the Western District of Tennessee
People from Memphis, Tennessee
United States district court judges appointed by George W. Bush
21st-century American judges
Yale Law School alumni